Outcasts of the Trail is a 1949 American Western film directed by Philip Ford and written by Olive Cooper. The film stars Monte Hale, Paul Hurst, Jeff Donnell, Roy Barcroft, John Gallaudet and Milton Parsons. The film was released on June 8, 1949, by Republic Pictures.

Plot

Cast    
Monte Hale as Pat Garrett
Paul Hurst as Doc Meadowlark
Jeff Donnell as Vinnie White
Roy Barcroft as Jim Judd
John Gallaudet as Ivory White
Milton Parsons as Elias Dunkenscold
Tommy Ivo as Chad White
Minerva Urecal as Abbie Rysen
Ted Mapes as Fred Smith
George Lloyd as Horace Rysen 
Steve Darrell as Sheriff Wilson

References

External links 
 

1949 films
American Western (genre) films
1949 Western (genre) films
Republic Pictures films
Films directed by Philip Ford
Cultural depictions of Pat Garrett
American black-and-white films
1940s English-language films
1940s American films